Anton Karachanakov (Bulgarian: Антон Карачанаков; born 17 January 1992) is a Bulgarian second professional football league who plays as a winger for Montana.

Career

Pirin Blagoevgrad 
Born in Novo Delchevo, near Sandanski, Karachanakov progressed through Pirin Blagoevgrad's youth system, having joined the club at the age of 14 in 2006.

He made his first team debut on 26 February 2011 in a 1–0 A PFG loss against Cherno More, coming on as a substitute for Anton Kostadinov. On 12 March, he scored his first goal in his first start, netting Pirin's only goal in their 2–1 loss against Litex Lovech.
 
Karachanakov finished the 2010–11 season with 16 appearances and four goals in all competitions, helping Pirin to secure their status in the top-flight of Bulgarian football league system. Finally, Pirin was relegated to fourth division, after the license necessary to play in the A PFG was denied by Bulgarian Football Federation.

CSKA Sofia 
On 18 June 2011, Karachanakov joined CSKA Sofia on a free transfer. He scored his first league goal for CSKA on 22 March 2012, in the 4–0 home win over Lokomotiv Sofia. He scored in his next two games as well, against Lokomotiv Plovdiv on 25 March and against Beroe Stara Zagora three days later.

On 31 August 2012, Karachanakov scored his first brace for the club, scoring twice in a 4–1 away win against Minyor Pernik. In October 2012, he sustained an injury during The Eternal Derby and was ruled out until the end of the season.

Karachanakov made a full recovery by June 2013. On 14 December 2013, he scored his first two goals (and second brace for the club) after coming back from injury in a 7–0 thrashing of Lyubimets 2007.

On 27 July 2014, Karachanakov scored the opening goal and assisted Sergiu Buș' second in the 2–0 win over Levski Sofia in The Eternal Derby. For his performance he won the Man of the Match award. In January 2015, he left the "armymen" due to a combination of financial reasons (unreceived salaries) and not being granted sufficient playing time.

Botev Plovdiv 
Karachanakov signed with Botev Plovdiv in January 2019. He left the team by mutual consent in August 2019 and joined Tsarsko Selo.

International career
His first goal for the Bulgarian U21 squad came in his second match on 29 February 2012 as he scored the only goal in a 1–0 friendly win against Poland U21.

Career statistics

Honours
CSKA Sofia
 Bulgarian Supercup (1): 2011

References

External links
 Guardian's Stats Centre
 
 Profile at sportal.bg
 

1992 births
Living people
Bulgarian footballers
Bulgarian expatriate footballers
Bulgaria under-21 international footballers
First Professional Football League (Bulgaria) players
Ekstraklasa players
Liga II players
PFC Pirin Blagoevgrad players
PFC CSKA Sofia players
FC Baltika Kaliningrad players
PFC Slavia Sofia players
MKS Cracovia (football) players
PFC Beroe Stara Zagora players
Panachaiki F.C. players
Botev Plovdiv players
FC Tsarsko Selo Sofia players
FC Politehnica Iași (2010) players
Expatriate footballers in Russia
Bulgarian expatriate sportspeople in Russia
Expatriate footballers in Poland
Bulgarian expatriate sportspeople in Poland
Expatriate footballers in Greece
Bulgarian expatriate sportspeople in Greece
Expatriate footballers in Romania
Bulgarian expatriate sportspeople in Romania
Association football wingers
People from Blagoevgrad Province
Sportspeople from Blagoevgrad Province
21st-century Bulgarian people